Rineloricaria anhaguapitan is a species of catfish in the family Loricariidae. It is native to South America, where it occurs in tributaries of the Passo Fundo River in the Uruguay River basin in Brazil. The species reaches 12.7 cm (5 inches) in standard length and is believed to be a facultative air-breather. Although its specific name has been spelled as both anhanguapitan and anhaguapitan, FishBase considers Rineloricaria anhaguapitan to be the correct name.

References 

Loricariini
Fish described in 2008
Catfish of South America
Fish of Brazil